Rory W. McTurk is a British philologist. McTurk graduated from Oxford University in 1963. He took a further degree at the University of Iceland in 1965, and subsequently taught at Lund University, the University of Copenhagen, and University College Dublin. He took up a post at the University of Leeds in 1978, where he has gained the position of Professor Emeritus of Icelandic Studies. McTurk has authored, edited and translated many works on Icelandic literature, including the works of Steinnun Sigurðardóttir. He is a recipient of the Order of the Falcon.

Selected bibliography
 Studies in Ragnars Saga Loðbrókar and its Major Scandinavian Analogues, 1991
 Chaucer and the Norse and Celtic Worlds, 2005

References

Academics of University College Dublin
Academics of the University of Leeds
Alumni of the University of Oxford
British philologists
Living people
Academic staff of Lund University
Old Norse studies scholars
Recipients of the Order of the Falcon
Year of birth missing (living people)
Academic staff of the University of Copenhagen
University of Iceland alumni